Ian Donald Leggatt (born September 23, 1965) is a Canadian professional golfer.

Early life
Leggatt was born in Galt, now part of Cambridge, Ontario.

Professional career
Leggatt has won one PGA Tour event and one Nationwide Tour event. He retired from professional golf in May 2009 due to injuries.

Leggatt now works for Wasserman Media Group as an agent/consultant in their golf management division. He appears on Sportsnet as their golf analyst.

Professional wins (2)

PGA Tour wins (1)

Buy.com Tour wins (1)

Buy.com Tour playoff record (1–0)

Results in major championships

CUT = missed the half-way cut
"T" indicates a tie for a place
Note: Leggatt never played in the Masters Tournament or The Open Championship.

Team appearances
World Cup (representing Canada): 1998, 2001, 2002

See also
2000 Buy.com Tour graduates
2001 PGA Tour Qualifying School graduates
2005 PGA Tour Qualifying School graduates

References

External links

Canadian male golfers
PGA Tour golfers
Korn Ferry Tour graduates
Golfing people from Ontario
People from Cambridge, Ontario
1965 births
Living people